Babi Yar: A Document in the Form of a Novel is an internationally acclaimed documentary novel by Anatoly Kuznetsov about the Nazi occupation of Kyiv, and the massacres at Babi Yar. The two-day murder of 33,771 Jewish civilians on September 29–30, 1941 in the Kyiv ravine was one of the largest single mass killings of the Holocaust.

History
Kuznetsov began writing a memoir of his wartime life in a notebook when he was 14. Over the years he continued working on it, adding documents and eyewitness testimonies. 

The novel was first published in 1966 in what Kuznetsov would later describe as a censored form in the Soviet monthly literary magazine Yunost in the original Russian language. The magazine's copy editors cut the book down by[?] a quarter of its original length and introduced additional politically correct material.

In 1969 Kuznetsov defected from the USSR to the UK and managed to smuggle 35-mm photographic film containing the unedited manuscript. The book was published in the West in 1970 under a pseudonym, A. Anatoli. In that edition, the edited Soviet version was put in regular type, the content cut by editors in heavier type and newly added material was in brackets. In the foreword to the Russian-language edition by the New York-based publishing house Posev, Kuznetsov wrote: 

In 2022, following the Russian invasion of Ukraine, the Ministry of Education and Science of Ukraine proposed the removal of Babi Yar as well as many other Russian, Soviet and Belarusian works from the school curriculum for grades six through eleven.

Content

The novel begins as follows: 

Kuznetsov describes his own experiences, supplementing them with documents and testimonies of survivors. The tragedy of Babi Yar is shown in the context of German occupation of Kyiv from its first days of September 1941 until November 1943. "It is also about the curious fact that a 14-year-old boy can show up anywhere and adults -- German soldiers -- don't especially care. By accident, then, he saw what others were not allowed to see. And by accident, he survived the occupation and lived to write about it." The chapter "How Many Times I Should Have Been Shot" lists 20 reasons the fascists should have shot him according to orders issued by the Nazi occupiers. 

When he talks about his own family, the author does not shy away from criticizing the Soviet regime. Several intermissions directly address the future reader. 

One of the most often-cited parts of the novel is the story of Dina Pronicheva, an actress of Kyiv Puppet Theater. She was one of those ordered to march to the ravine, forced to undress, and then shot. Badly wounded, she played dead in a pile of corpses, and eventually managed to escape. One of the very few survivors of the massacre, she later told her horrifying story to Kuznetsov.

The novel concludes with a warning:

See also

 Babi Yar
 Babi Yar memorials

References

External links
  Babi Yar: A Document in the Form of a Novel by Anatoly Kuznetsov. The Yunost literary magazine, 1966. (censored version)
  Babi Yar: A Document in the Form of a Novel (RTF file) by Anatoly Kuznetsov. Posev, 1973. (Full uncensored edition) (Zipped)
"Ravine of the Dead". Time.  April 7, 1967.

1966 novels
Soviet novels
Personal accounts of the Holocaust
1966 in the Soviet Union
Babi Yar
Novels set in Ukraine
Novels set in Kyiv